The lion's mane jellyfish (Cyanea capillata), also known as the giant jellyfish, arctic red jellyfish, or the hair jelly, is one of the largest known species of jellyfish. Its range is confined to cold, boreal waters of the Arctic, northern Atlantic, and northern Pacific Oceans. It is common in the English Channel, Irish Sea, North Sea, and in western Scandinavian waters south to Kattegat and Øresund. It may also drift into the southwestern part of the Baltic Sea (where it cannot breed due to the low salinity). Similar jellyfish – which may be the same species – are known to inhabit seas near Australia and New Zealand. Lion's mane jellyfish have been observed below 42°N latitude for some time in the larger bays of the East Coast of the United States.

The lion's mane jellyfish uses its stinging tentacles to capture, pull in, and eat prey such as fish, zooplankton, sea creatures, and smaller jellyfish.

Taxonomy 

The taxonomy of the Cyanea species is not fully agreed upon; some zoologists have suggested that all species within the genus should be treated as one. Two distinct taxa, however, occur together in at least the eastern North Atlantic, with the blue jellyfish (Cyanea lamarckii Péron & Lesueur, 1810) differing in color (blue, not red) and smaller size ( diameter, rarely ). Populations in the western Pacific around Japan are sometimes distinguished as Cyanea nozakii, or as a subspecies, C. c. nozakii. In 2015, Russian researchers announced a possible sister species, Cyanea tzetlinii found in the White Sea, but this has not yet been recognized by other authoritative databases such as WoRMS or ITIS.

Description 
Lion's mane jellyfish (Cyanea capillata) are named for their showy, trailing tentacles reminiscent of a lion's mane. Larger specimens are typically further offshore than smaller ones. Juveniles are lighter orange or tan, very young lion's manes are occasionally colorless and adults are red and start to darken as they age.

While most jellyfish such as the moon jelly have a circular bell, the bell of the Lion's Mane is divided into eight lobes, resembling an eight-pointed star. Each lobe contains about 70 to 150 tentacles, arranged in four fairly distinct rows. Along the bell margin is a balance organ at each of the eight indentations between the lobes – the rhopalium – which helps the jellyfish orient itself. From the central mouth extend broad frilly oral arms with many stinging cells. Closer to its mouth, its total number of tentacles is around 1,200.

The long, thin tentacles which emanate from the bell's subumbrella have been characterised as “extremely sticky”; they also have stinging cells. This unusual length – longer than a blue whale – has earned it the status of one of the longest known animals in the world.

Behavior and reproduction 

Lion's mane jellyfish remain mostly very near the surface, at no more than  depth. Their slow pulsations weakly drive them forward, so they depend on ocean currents to travel great distances. The jellyfish are most often spotted during the late summer and autumn, when they have grown to a large size and the currents begin to sweep them to shore. Unlike most pelagic jellyfish, they are completely solitary and rarely travel in groups. 

Like other jellyfish, lion's manes are capable of both sexual reproduction in the medusa stage and asexual reproduction in the polyp stage. Lion's mane jellyfish have four different stages in their year-long lifespan: a larval stage, a polyp stage, an ephyrae stage, and the medusa stage. The female jellyfish carries its fertilized eggs in its tentacle, where the eggs grow into larvae. When the larvae are old enough, the female deposits them on a hard surface, where the larvae soon grow into polyps. The polyps begin to reproduce asexually, creating stacks of small creatures called ephyrae. The individual ephyrae break off the stacks, where they eventually grow into the medusa stage and become full-grown jellyfish.

Sting and human contact 

Human encounters with the jellyfish can cause temporary pain and localized redness. In normal circumstances, however, and in healthy individuals, the stings of the jellyfish are not known to be fatal; vinegar can be used to deactivate the nematocysts. If there is contact with a large number of tentacles, however, medical attention is recommended after exposure.

There may be a significant difference between touching a few tentacles with fingertips at a beach and accidentally swimming into the jellyfish. The initial sensation is more strange than painful and feels like swimming into warmer and somewhat effervescent water. Some minor pain will soon follow. Normally, there is no real danger to humans (with the exception of people suffering from special allergies). But in cases when someone has been stung over large parts of their body by not just the longest tentacles but the entire jellyfish (including the inner tentacles, of which there are around 1,200), 
medical attention is recommended as systemic effects can be present. Although rarely, severe stings in deep water can also cause panic followed by drowning.

On a July day in 2010, around 150 beachgoers were stung by broken-up Lion's mane jellyfish remains in Wallis Sands State Beach, Rye, New Hampshire, USA. Considering the size of the species, it is possible that this incident was caused by a single specimen.

In popular culture 
The lion's mane jellyfish appears in the Sherlock Holmes short story "The Adventure of the Lion's Mane" published in The Case-Book of Sherlock Holmes. Holmes discovers at the end of the story that the true killer of a professor who died shortly after going swimming (shouting "the lion's mane" before he succumbed) was actually this jellyfish. Suspicion was originally laid upon the professor's rival in love, until the latter was similarly attacked (he survived, although badly stung). In the context of the story, it is only because the school professor has a weak heart that he succumbs, as is confirmed by the survival of the second victim.

A photograph widely distributed on the internet appears to show an anomalously large lion's mane dwarfing a nearby diver by several times. The photo was subsequently shown to be a hoax.

On the popular television program QI, the show claimed that the longest animal in the world was the lion's mane jellyfish. (This claim is disputed because bootlace worms can easily stretch to several times their natural length, so it is possible the worm did not actually grow to be that length.)

Predators 
Seabirds, larger fish such as ocean sunfish, other jellyfish species, and most sea turtles will only attack juveniles or smaller specimens while a fully grown adult is incapable of being eaten, due to their massive size and the abundance of stinging tentacles they possess, although both adults and juveniles have been documented eaten by anemones. The leatherback sea turtle feeds almost exclusively on them in large quantities during the summer season around Eastern Canada.

Gallery

References

Other sources 
British Marine Life Study Society – C. capillata and C. lamarcki
Marine Life Information (UK)
Marine Biological Laboratory (Massachusetts)
Pacific Coast jellies

External links 

Video footage of stranded Lion's Mane Jellyfish
 

Cnidarians of the Atlantic Ocean
Cnidarians of the Pacific Ocean
Animals described in 1758
Taxa named by Carl Linnaeus